Tverrådalskyrkja is a mountain on the border of Skjåk Municipality in Innlandet county and Luster Municipality in Vestland county, Norway. The mountain is surrounded by several other notable mountains including Tundradalskyrkja to the east, Holåtindan to the southeast, Røykeskardhøi to the west, and Syrtbyttnosi to the northwest.

Tverrådalskyrkja can be reached from the Norwegian Mountain Touring Association cabin Sotasæter. Usual access to the peak is over the Fortundalsbreen glacier, then along the eastern ridge.

Name
The first element is the genitive of the valley name Tverrådalen. The last element is the finite form of kyrkje which means "church". (Several mountains in Norway are named Kyrkja because of some likeness in shape with a church.) The first element of the valley name is the river name Tverråa and the last element is the finite form of dal which means "dale" or "valley". The river name is a compound of tverr which means "cross" and the finite form of å which means "(small) river"—thus it is a "side river" (to a bigger river).

Store Tverrådalskyrkja means "The Big Tverrådalskyrkja" and Søre Tverrådalskyrkja means "The Southern Tverrådalskyrkja".

See also
List of mountains of Norway

References

External links
 Tverrådalskyrkja

Skjåk
Luster, Norway
Mountains of Innlandet
Mountains of Vestland